In digital image processing, morphological skeleton is a skeleton (or medial axis) representation of a shape or binary image, computed by means of morphological operators.

Morphological skeletons are of two kinds: 
 Those defined by means of morphological openings, from which the original shape can be reconstructed,
 Those computed by means of the hit-or-miss transform, which preserve the shape's topology.

Skeleton by openings

Lantuéjoul's formula

Continuous images
In (Lantuéjoul 1977), Lantuéjoul derived the following morphological formula for the skeleton of a continuous binary image :

,

Discrete images
, and
, where o denotes the origin.

The variable n is called the size of the structuring element.

Lantuéjoul's formula has been discretized as follows.

.

Reconstruction from the skeleton
The original shape X can be reconstructed from the set of skeleton subsets  as follows:

.

Partial reconstructions can also be performed, leading to opened versions of the original shape:

.

The skeleton as the centers of the maximal disks

A shape  centered at z is called a maximal disk in a set A when:
 , and
 if, for some integer m and some point y, then .

Each skeleton subset  consists of the centers of all maximal disks of size n.

Performing Morphological Skeletonization on Images 

Morphological Skeletonization can be considered as a controlled erosion process. This involves shrinking the image until the area of interest is 1 pixel wide. This can allow quick and accurate image processing on an otherwise large and memory intensive operation. A great example of using skeletonization on an image is processing fingerprints. This can be quickly accomplished using bwmorph; a built-in Matlab function which will implement the Skeletonization Morphology technique to the image. 

The image to the right shows the extent of what skeleton morphology can accomplish. Given a partial image, it is possible to extract a much fuller picture. Properly pre-processing the image with a simple Auto Threshold grayscale to binary converter will give the skeletonization function an easier time thinning. The higher contrast ratio will allow the lines to joined in a more accurate manner. Allowing to properly reconstruct the fingerprint. 

 skelIm = bwmorph(orIm,'skel',Inf); %Function used to generate Skeletonization Images

Notes

References
 Image Analysis and Mathematical Morphology by Jean Serra,  (1982)
 Image Analysis and Mathematical Morphology, Volume 2: Theoretical Advances by Jean Serra,  (1988)
 An Introduction to Morphological Image Processing by Edward R. Dougherty,  (1992)
 Ch. Lantuéjoul, "Sur le modèle de Johnson-Mehl généralisé", Internal report of the Centre de Morph. Math., Fontainebleau, France, 1977.
 Scott E. Umbaugh (2018). Digital Image Processing and Analysis, pp 93-96. CRC Press. 

Mathematical morphology
Digital geometry